Lobomycosis is a fungal infection of the skin. It usually presents with bumps in the skin, firm swellings, deep skin lesions, or malignant tumors.

It is caused by Lacazia loboi (formerly named Loboa loboi). Transmission is generally by direct contact with contaminated water, soil, vegetation, or by direct contact with an infected dolphin.

Diagnosis is by identifying Lacazia laboi in a lesion.

This disease is usually found in humans and bottlenose dolphins, with the possible risk of transmission from one species to the other.

It was discovered by Brazilian dermatologist Jorge Lobo. Other names which were given to the disease are: keloidal blastomycosis, Amazonian blastomycosis, blastomycoid granuloma, miraip and piraip. These last two names were given by natives of the Amazon and mean that which burns.

Signs and symptoms
The disease is endemic in rural regions in South America and Central America.Infection most commonly develops after minor scratches or insect bites, but many patients cannot recall any skin trauma.  Human-to-human transmission does not occur, and the disease is only acquired from the environment.  The disease manifests as chronic keloidal nodular lesions on the ears, legs, or arms.

Diagnosis of Lobo's disease is made by taking a sample of the infected skin (a skin biopsy) and examining it under the microscope. Lacazia loboi is characterized by long chains of spherical cells interconnected by tubules. The cells appear to be yeast-like with a diameter of 5 to 12 μm.  Attempts to culture L. loboi have so far been unsuccessful.

Diagnosis

Differential diagnosis
The disease is often misdiagnosed as Blastomyces dermatitidis or Paracoccidiodes brasiliensis due to its similar morphology.

Treatment
Surgical excision or cryosurgery is the treatment of choice. Treatment with antifungals has been considered ineffective, but the use of clofazimine and dapsone in patients with leprosy and lobomycosis has been found to improve the latter. This treatment regimen, with concomitant itraconazole, has been used to prevent recurrence after surgery.

Other animals
Lesions in dolphins occur on the dorsal fin, head, flukes, and peduncle.  In January 2006, a potential epidemic of lobomycosis was reported in dolphins of the Indian River Lagoon in Florida.

See also 
 List of cutaneous conditions

References

Further reading 
 Bermudez, L., M.F. van Bressem, O. Reyes-Jaimes, A.J. Sayegh & A.E. Paniz Mondolfi (2009) Lobomycosis in man and lobomycosis-like disease in bottlenose dolphin, Venezuela. Emerg. Infect. Dis., 15: 1301–1303.
 Carvalho, K. A. D., Floriano, M. C., Enokihara, M. M. S., & Mascarenhas, M. R. M. (2015). Jorge Lobo’s disease. Anais brasileiros de dermatologia, 90(4), 586–588.
 Esperon, F., D. Garcia-Parraga, E.N. Belliere & J.M. Sanchez-Vizcaino (2012) Molecular diagnosis of lobomycosis-like disease in a bottlenose dolphin in captivity. Med. Mycol., 50: 106–109.
 Francesconi, V. A., Klein, A. P., Santos, A. P. B. G., Ramasawmy, R., & Francesconi, F (2014) Lobomycosis: epidemiology, clinical presentation, and management options. Therapeutics and Clinical Risk Management, 10, 851.
 
 Paniz-Mondolfi, A., C. Talhari, L.S. Hoffmann, D.L. Connor and S. Talhari & al. (2012) Lobomycosis: An emerging disease in humans and delphinidae. Mycoses, 55: 298-309 | résumé.
 Reif, J.S., A.M. Schaefer & G.D. Bossart (2013) Lobomycosis: Risk of zoonotic transmission from dolphins to humans. Vector Borne Zoonotic Dis., 13: 689–693.
 Schaefer, A. M., Reif, J. S., Guzmán, E. A., Bossart, G. D., Ottuso, P., Snyder, J., ... & McCarthy, P. J. (2016). Toward the identification, characterization and experimental culture of Lacazia loboi from Atlantic bottlenose dolphin (Tursiops truncatus). Sabouraudia, 54(6), 659–665.

External links 

Tropical diseases
Animal fungal diseases
Mycosis-related cutaneous conditions